Starbuck was a rock band formed in Atlanta, Georgia, in 1974 by keyboardist/vocalist/record producer Bruce Blackman and marimba player Bo Wagner. Both Blackman and Wagner, along with guitarist Johnny Walker, had previous success with Mississippi-based "sunshine pop" group Eternity's Children, scoring a Billboard Hot 100 hit with "Mrs. Bluebird" in the summer of 1968. Wagner worked as a studio musician in Los Angeles in the early 1970s, appeared on The Lawrence Welk Show, and played drums for the extravagant pianist Liberace.

Starbuck's debut single, "Moonlight Feels Right", reached the No. 3 position on the Billboard Hot 100 singles charts in 1976. Although the band never re-created the success of their debut, several of their songs did chart in the Billboard Top 100, and their 1977 release "Everybody Be Dancin'" reached No. 38.

From 1976 to 1980, the band toured with popular groups of the era, including Electric Light Orchestra, KC and the Sunshine Band, Hall & Oates, England Dan & John Ford Coley and Boston. TV appearances included The Midnight Special, American Bandstand, The Merv Griffin Show, Dinah!, The Mike Douglas Show, and Solid Gold.
     
The band was briefly known as Korona in the early 1980s, getting one Hot 100 hit in 1980, "Let Me Be," which reached No. 43 in April.

In July 2013, a number of former Starbuck members (founders Blackman and Wagner, guitarist Tommy Strain, keyboardists Sloan Hayes and David Shaver, bassist Jimmy Cobb, and drummer Kenny Crysler) performed at Chastain Park in Atlanta.

The group also reunited once more for their final performance on August 20, 2016, with the same lineup as their previous reunion concert in 2013. In 2022 12 new songs were released by Bruce Blackman on the album Starbuck 2022".

Blackman was inducted into the Mississippi Writer's Garden on April 5, 2014. He detailed the story of Starbuck in his 2018 book, The Road to Moonlight Feels Right - the story behind one of the most popular songs of the '70s''.

Robert "Bo" Wagner went on to set up a performing arts school and taught music and dance. He then shifted careers into health care for the entertainment industry, using the name "Dr Bo". He died on June 20, 2017, in Santa Monica, California, aged 72.

Discography

Albums

Singles

References

External links
Moonlight Feels Right (Bruce Blackman's official Starbuck site)
 

Musical groups established in 1974
Musical groups disestablished in 1980
Musical groups from Georgia (U.S. state)
United Artists Records artists
Musical groups from Atlanta
Private Stock Records artists